Aurich (East Frisian Low Saxon: Auerk, West Frisian: Auwerk) is a town in the East Frisian region of Lower Saxony, Germany. It is the capital of the district of Aurich and is the second largest City in East Frisia, both in population, after Emden, and in area, after Wittmund.

History

The history of Aurich dates back to the 13th century, when the settlement of Aurechove was mentioned in a Frisian document called the Brokmerbrief in 1276.  There are various hypotheses about the interpretation of the city name. It either refers to a person (Affo, East Frisian first name ) and his property (Reich) or it refers to waterworks on the fertile, water-rich lowland of the Aa (or Ehe) river, upon which the city was built; medieval realizations were Aurichove, Aurike, Aurikehove, Auerk, Auryke, Auwerckhove, Auwerick, Auwerck, Auwreke, Awerck, Awreke, Awrik, Auwerich and Aurickeshove .

In 1517, Count Edzard from the House of Cirksena began rebuilding the town after an attack. In 1539, the land authorities were brought together in Aurich, making it the county capital and, later, East Frisia, remaining the seat of the land authorities when East Frisia was inherited by the Kingdom of Prussia in 1744. After the Prussian Army was defeated in the Battle of Jena in 1807, Aurich became part of the Kingdom of Holland in 1808. In 1810, the Kingdom of Holland was annexed by France and Aurich was made the capital of the department Ems-Oriental of the First French Empire. After Napoleon was defeated in 1814, it passed to the Kingdom of Hanover in 1815, and then was annexed by Prussia in 1866 and made part of the Province of Hanover.

From 21 October 1944, until 23 December 1944, a Nazi concentration camp was established in Aurich. The camp was a subcamp to the Neuengamme concentration camp.

After World War II, Aurich became part of the new state of Lower Saxony.

Local council
The local council has 40 members
The elections in September 2016 showed the following results
SPD: 13 seats
CDU: 11 seats
AWG 4 seats
Gemeinsam für Aurich (GfA), 4 seats
Alliance 90/The Greens 3 seats
The Left 2 seats
Grün-Alternative Politik (GAP)(Green alternative politics) 2 seats
FDP, 1 seat

Coat of arms
Aurich's coat of arms is drawn by the blazon: "Arms: Landscape with chief two-thirds sky and base third earth, a shield Gules emblazoned with letter 'A' Or, an open-topped crown Or above, two growing trees Vert at sides. Crown: A battlement Gules with three merlons and two embrasures. Supporters: Two branches of mistletoe with leaves and berries Or.".

Note that the coat of arms of the district with the same name is different.

Twin towns – sister cities

Aurich is twinned with:
 Appingedam, Netherlands

Notable people

Liefmann Calmer (1711–1784), important personage in French Jewry of the eighteenth century
Friedrich August Peter von Colomb (1775–1854), Prussian general
Rudolf von Jhering (1818–1892), jurist.
Karl Heinrich Ulrichs (1825–1895), writer 
Laura Hillman (1923–2020), American writer and memoirist, and Holocaust survivor
Rudolf Eucken (1846–1926), philosopher, winner of the 1908 Nobel Prize for Literature.  
Karl Deichgräber (1903–1984), classical philologist
Yitzhak Raveh (1906–1989), Israeli judge
Aloys Wobben (1952–2021), engineer
Uwe Rosenberg (born 1970), board game designer
Paul Ronzheimer (born 1985), journalist and war correspondent

See also
List of subcamps of Neuengamme

References

External links

 
Official German list of concentration camps Record of the concentration camp and its sub-camps 

Neuengamme concentration camp
Aurich (district)
Towns and villages in East Frisia